Birthe Nielsen (24 October 1926 – 4 December 2010) was a Danish sprinter. She competed in the women's 100 metres at the 1948 Summer Olympics.

References

External links
 

1926 births
2010 deaths
Athletes (track and field) at the 1948 Summer Olympics
Danish female sprinters
Olympic athletes of Denmark
Olympic female sprinters